The Loomis Museum, also known as the Loomis Visitor Center, the Manzanita Lake Visitor Center and the Manzanita Lake Museum, was built by Benjamin Franklin Loomis in 1927 near Manzanita Lake, just outside Lassen Volcanic National Park in California, USA. Loomis was a local homesteader and photographer who documented the 1915 eruptions of Lassen Peak, and was instrumental in the 1916 establishment of the national park.

Loomis had desired that the headquarters of the new park be established at Manzanita Lake, but an alternate site was chosen by the Park Service.  Loomis and his wife Estella started building their own museum to exhibit photographs taken by Loomis and others, as well as geological exhibits and artifacts of local Native Americans. The building was dedicated on July 4, 1927 as the Mae Loomis Memorial Museum, named after their only child, Luisa Mae Loomis, who had died in 1920.

Description 
The Loomis Museum is a one-story rectangular building built of local volcanic rock in cut-face random ashlar coursing. The building is characterized by its prominent crenelated stepped parapets. Contrasting with the rustic character of the stonework, the main entrance features formal sidelights and a fanlight. A small bracketed shed roof shelters the entrance, and the side elevations have similar shed projections down their length., all roofed with green tile. The interior is primarily composed of a single large room.

The station was built by the Loomises in 1926. It features three large windows that allow visitors to view the seismographic equipment within.

Described in 1952 as "ugly quasi-Spanish", the Loomis Museum was briefly considered for demolition and replacement during the Mission 66 program.    The museum and seismograph station were placed on the National Register of Historic Places on February 25, 1975. The museum was renovated in 1994, the seismograph building in 1995. It is now used as a visitor contact center by the Park Service. The museum and seismograph building are also part of the Manzanita Lake Naturalist's Services Historic District.

References

External links
 Loomis Museum at Manzanita Lake - National Park Service

National Register of Historic Places in Lassen Volcanic National Park
Buildings and structures on the National Register of Historic Places in California
Museums on the National Register of Historic Places
Museums in Shasta County, California
Rustic architecture in California
Natural history museums in California
National Register of Historic Places in Shasta County, California
Individually listed contributing properties to historic districts on the National Register in California
National Park Service museums